The Cleveland Orchestra, which was founded in 1918, was first recorded in 1924.  Most of the orchestra's recordings have been made either in its concert home, Severance Hall, or in nearby Masonic Auditorium.

Record labels
The Cleveland Orchestra's first recording, of Tchaikovsky's 1812 Overture, was made for the Brunswick label with its first music director, Nikolai Sokoloff.

The Cleveland Orchestra began a long-running association with the Columbia Masterworks label under conductor Artur Rodziński. Successors Erich Leinsdorf, George Szell, and Lorin Maazel all recorded for Columbia, with some early Szell records being assigned to Columbia's budget sub-label, Epic. Szell's recordings with Cleveland in particular have remained steadily in print. In the 1990s the Columbia catalogue was acquired by Sony Classics, which continues to issue the recordings.

The Cleveland Orchestra was one of the first to find new audiences via digital recording technology thanks to its collaboration with the locally-based audiophile label Telarc.  This association, as well as one with Decca, began under Maazel and continued under his successor Christoph von Dohnányi. The orchestra's cycle of the complete Beethoven symphonies with Dohnányi was one of the first digitally recorded cycles by a major orchestra. The orchestra has also been recorded with a number of guest conductors, including Vladimir Ashkenazy, Riccardo Chailly and Pierre Boulez, who was musical advisor to the orchestra from 1970–1972.

The pace of the orchestra's recording activity slowed in the late 1990s when market demand dropped for new CDs. A project to record Wagner's complete Ring cycle with Dohnányi for Decca was left unfinished. Despite the many changes facing commercial record labels at the turn of the century, the orchestra continues to be featured in new releases. In 2007 the orchestra recorded Beethoven's Ninth Symphony under Franz Welser-Möst for Deutsche Grammophon.  Pianist Mitsuko Uchida has begun a series of Mozart piano concertos with the orchestra for the Decca label.

Premiere recordings
The Cleveland Orchestra has long been known for performing newer music.  Some notable world premiere recordings include:

 Sergei Rachmaninoff: Symphony No. 2 (abridged) (Nikolai Sokoloff, conductor)
 Alban Berg: Violin Concerto (Artur Rodziński, conductor/Louis Krasner, violin)
 John Adams: Century Rolls (Christoph von Dohnányi, conductor/Emanuel Ax, pianist)
 Harrison Birtwistle: Sonance Severance 2000 (Christoph von Dohnányi, conductor)

Discography
The discography below is not comprehensive, but rather representative.  The listing only contains Compact Disc releases and does not contain 78rpm, LP, Cassette, or 8-track tape releases.  In addition to recordings issued on major labels, it includes limited edition releases on the orchestra's private label.  The Cleveland Orchestra's complete discography up to 2000 can be found in Donald Rosenberg's book, The Cleveland Orchestra Story – Second to None.

Guest appearances
The Cleveland Orchestra was heard on the Michael Jackson album Dangerous in the song "Will You Be There", which was used as the theme song to the film Free Willy.

References

Orchestra discographies
Music of Cleveland